SNCF Voyageurs (English: SNCF Travelers) is a state-owned enterprise founded on 1 January 2020, an independent subsidiary of the French National Railway Company (SNCF), in charge of operating passenger trains.

Its predecessor is (partially) SNCF Mobilités EPIC which was founded on 1 January 2015.

Business scope 
Its first CEO is Christophe Fanichet. He was appointed by Jean-Pierre Farandou (SNCF President).

Its several divisions are responsible for:

 Voyages SNCF operates trains in France and Europe, including the flagship TGV inOui service, along with the low cost Ouigo TGV service and Intercités traditional long-distance services
 TER operates commuter rail network serving all the French regions, except  Île-de-France. 
 Transilien operates RER and commuter rail network serving Île-de-France, the region surrounding and including the city of Paris.
 Industrial Operations: Rolling Stock engineering and maintenance.
 E-Voyageurs: includes the online travel agent OUI.sncf and the Assistant SNCF app.

International high-speed services are operated by its subsidiaries Eurostar, Lyria and Thalys.

History 
On 1 January 2020, the 3 EPIC companies and their subsidiaries become one state-owned group consisting of a parent company with its subsidiaries: SNCF Voyageurs, SNCF Réseau, Rail Logistics Europe, Keolis and Geodis. The previous SNCF Mobilités is dismantled. SNCF Gares & Connexions is integrated to the new SNCF Réseau company, while the logistics activities, rail freight (Geodis and FRET SNCF) and Keolis have directly joined the parent company. TGV inOui service, along with the low cost Ouigo TGV service, Intercités traditional long-distance services, TER, RER, Transilien regional services and the web site Oui.sncf become this new company named SNCF Voyageurs.

Company management 
The management team consists of the following members:
 CEO: Christophe Fanichet
 Transilien Manager: Sylvie Charles
 Voyages Manager: Alain Krakovitch
 TER vice-Manager: Jean-Aimé Mougenot
 Industrial Manager: Xavier Ouin
 Secretacy-General: Antoine de Rocquigny
 E.Voyageurs SNCF Manager: Anne Pruvot (since 15 January 2021)
 Security Manager: Damien Pallant
 Human Ressources Manager: Lucile Quessart
 Chief of staff: Lucie Ruat

See also 
Parent company (SNCF)

References

External links
 Website of SNCF Voyageurs
 Website of SNCF

SNCF companies and subsidiaries
Government-owned companies of France
Railway companies of France
Rail transport in France
Railway companies established in 2020
French brands